The Slovene ambassador in Washington, D. C. is the official representative of the Government in Ljubljana to the Government of the United States.

List of representatives

See also
Slovenia–United States relations

References 

 
United States
Slovenia